The New Zealand women's cricket team toured to play against Australia women's cricket team between September 2018 and October 2018, and again between February 2019 and March 2019. The tour consisted of three Women's One Day Internationals (WODIs), which formed part of the 2017–20 ICC Women's Championship, and three Women's Twenty20 Internationals (WT20I). Prior to the tour, Suzie Bates stepped down as captain of New Zealand Women and was replaced by Amy Satterthwaite.

Australia Women won the WT20I series 3–0. They also won the WODI series 3–0.

Squads

Sophie Molineux was ruled out of Australia's WODI squad due to injury and was replaced by Delissa Kimmince.

Tour matches

1st 20 over match: Cricket Australia Women's XI vs Australia women

2nd 20 over match: Cricket Australia Women's XI vs New Zealand women

50 over match: Governor General's XI v New Zealand Women

WT20I series

1st WT20I

2nd WT20I

3rd WT20I

WODI series

1st WODI

2nd WODI

3rd WODI

References

External links
 Series home at ESPN Cricinfo

New Zealand 2018-19
Australia 2018-19
International cricket competitions in 2018–19
2017–20 ICC Women's Championship
2018–19 Australian women's cricket season
2018 in New Zealand cricket
2019 in New Zealand cricket
cricket
cricket
2018 in women's cricket
2019 in women's cricket